CFGB-FM is a radio station broadcasting at 89.5 MHz (FM) from Happy Valley-Goose Bay, Newfoundland and Labrador, Canada, and is the local Radio One station of the Canadian Broadcasting Corporation, serving as that network's primary outlet in Labrador. A shortwave relay, CKZN rebroadcasts CFGB's signal to remote areas of Labrador.

History
CFGB launched on February 23, 1953 on 1340 AM. It was originally operated by the Royal Canadian Air Force. It was taken over by the CBC on February 23, 1959 and became part of the CBC Northern Radio Service. The station received CBC news and topical programs by relaying the signal from CBA in Sackville, New Brunswick. Tapes recorded in Montreal were also flown in on regular airline flights. Eventually the station was linked into the primary CBC network feed.

In 1985, CFGB moved to 89.5 FM. The call sign then changed to CFGB-FM.

Local programming
CFGB produces its own local morning show, Labrador Morning hosted by Janice Goudie. CBDQ-FM in Labrador City also contributes reports.

For the remainder of local programming blocks within the CBC Radio One schedule, CFGB broadcasts programming from CBN in St. John's.

Transmitters

The callsign CBND was used by a former low-power AM rebroadcasting transmitter in Flower's Cove, which had operated at 790 kHz in 1972 to rebroadcast the programming of CBN. In 1968, CBND was approved to move from 600 kHz to 920 kHz according to the Canadian Communications Foundation's CBN website. Its unknown when CBND signed on in Flower's Cove and when it left the air, however, there's a CBND-FM currently operating at 105.1 MHz in Postville rebroadcasting CFGB-FM. 

On October 16, 2013, the CRTC approved the CBC's application to convert CBNK 570 to 93.9 MHz, broadcasting with an average effective radiated power of 50 watts (non-directional antenna with an effective height of antenna above average terrain of 19.1 metres). After CBNK's move to FM, the call sign was changed to CFGB-FM-1.

On May 24, 2016, the CBC applied to convert CBNZ 740 to 95.1 MHz with 50 watts of power (average and maximum ERP). Antenna height will be -29.63 metres with a non-directional radiation pattern. The CRTC approved the CBC's application to move CBNZ to 95.1 FM on September 7, 2016.

Shortwave relay

In 1989, a shortwave relay of CBN—St. John's with the call sign CKZN operating on 6.16 MHz (in the 49m band) was granted authority to rebroadcast CFGB part-time as well as CBN. In 1994, CKZN became a full-time rebroadcaster of CFGB. Operating at 1,000 watts, it can be heard over much of the North American continent and in Europe, particularly at night. CKZN's license was renewed by the CRTC in 2021.

References

External links
CBC Newfoundland and Labrador
 

Fgb
Fgb